Kiran ( Kirāṉ) is a town in the Batticaloa District of Sri Lanka. It is located 25 km north-west of the district capital Batticaloa.

Towns in Batticaloa District
Koralaipattu South DS Division